Julius Brach (9 January 1881, Brno – 4 July 1938, Vyškov, Moravia) was a Czech chess master.

In the beginning of his career, he won at Brno 1899, took 3rd at Osyky u Lomnice, took 2nd at Brno 1901, and took 3rd at Brno 1905. He tied for 5-6th at Nuremberg 1906 (the 15th DSB Congress, Hauptturnier A, Savielly Tartakower won), and shared 2nd at Brno 1907 (the 2nd Czech Chess Championship, František Treybal won).

He won at Brno 1908, tied for 8-9th at Prague 1908 (B tournament, Karel Treybal won), took 2nd at Brno 1909, and took 6th at Prague 1909 (the 3rd CZE-ch, Oldřich Duras won). In 1909, he played three matches in Brno; drew with Karel Hromádka (3 : 3), beat A. Perna (4 : 0), and defeated M. Gargulak (2.5 : 0.5). He took 2nd at Brno 1911, tied for 5-7th at Breslau 1912 (the 18th DSB Congress, Hauptturnier B, Paul Krüger), won at Brno 1913, and won in the Mannheim 1914 chess tournament (the 19th DSB Congress, Hauptturnier B).

During World War I, he shared 3rd at Brünn (Brno) 1916, won at Brno 1917, and tied for 9-11th at Kaschau (Košice) 1918 (Richard Réti won). After the war, he won at Brno 1920, tied for 8-9th at Brno 1921 (the 2nd Czechoslovak Chess Championship, Hromádka won), took 3rd at Pistyan (Piešťany) 1922 (B tournament, Endre Steiner won), tied for 9-11th at Znojmo 1927 (Karel Opočenský won), and took 8th at Olomouc 1930 (Karl Gilg won).

References

1881 births
1938 deaths
Czech chess players
Sportspeople from Brno
Chess players from the Austro-Hungarian Empire
Czechoslovak chess players